Rolling Prairie can refer to:
Rolling Prairie, Indiana
Rolling Prairie, Wisconsin